The 1991 Labatt Canada Cup was a professional international ice hockey tournament played in August and September 1991. The finals took place in Montreal on September 14 and Hamilton on September 16, and were won by Canada. The Canadians defeated the USA in a two-game sweep, to win the fifth and final Canada Cup. The tournament was replaced by the World Cup of Hockey in 1996.

Of the five Canada Cup tournaments, this is the only one in which a team went undefeated; Canada compiled a record of six wins and two ties in eight games. The first tie was a stunning 2–2 result with underdog Finland on the opening day of the tournament, who got spectacular goaltending from Markus Ketterer. Finland surprised many by finishing in third place in the round robin; the first time they had ever qualified for the semi-finals in the history of the Canada Cup. The Americans were also very strong, as they iced their best international line-up to date. They went a perfect 5–0 against European competition in the tournament, while losing three times to Canada.

The team representing the USSR was relatively weak compared to past tournaments, it did not have many of its top stars due to severe political turmoil at home, many players declining to play for the team, and purposely left off the roster (such as Pavel Bure, Vladimir Konstantinov, etc.) for fears of defection.
 It was not known until weeks before the start of the tournament that they would even send a team. This was the final major senior event in which a team representing the USSR would play.

Game 1 of the final is best remembered for the check on Wayne Gretzky by American defenseman Gary Suter, which knocked the Canadian captain out of the tournament and forced him to miss the first month of the NHL season. Game 2 was tied until late in the third period when Steve Larmer scored the tournament winner on a short-handed breakaway.

Rosters
See 1991 Canada Cup rosters

Standings

Results

Round-robin

Playoff round

Semi-finals

Final (best of three)

Leading scorers

Top Goalie: Bill Ranford, Canada (1.75 GAA)

Trophies and awards

Tournament champion
Canada

Tournament MVP
Bill Ranford, Canada,

All-star team
Goaltender: Bill Ranford, Canada
Defence: Al MacInnis, Canada; Chris Chelios, USA
Forwards: Wayne Gretzky, Canada; Mats Sundin, Sweden; Jeremy Roenick, USA

Notes

External links
Team USA Roster, Stats
Tournament Summary

1991
1991–92 in Canadian ice hockey
1991–92 in American ice hockey
1991–92 in Soviet ice hockey
1991–92 in Czechoslovak ice hockey
1991–92 in Finnish ice hockey
1991–92 in Swedish ice hockey
Ice hockey competitions in Hamilton, Ontario
1991 in Ontario
August 1991 sports events in Canada
September 1991 sports events in Canada
20th century in Hamilton, Ontario